Kasugaō Katsumasa (春日王 克昌, born 1 July 1977, as Kim Seong Taek) is a former sumo wrestler from Incheon, South Korea. He was the first sumo wrestler to reach the top makuuchi division officially representing South Korea. (Several other top wrestlers in the past have hid a Korean or half-Korean background). He joined sumo in 1998, making the top division for the first time in 2003. His highest rank was maegashira 3. In September 2009, he acquired Japanese citizenship. In April 2011 he was ordered to retire by the Japan Sumo Association after an investigation found him guilty of match-fixing.

Early life and sumo background 
His father died when he was just three years old and his mother brought the family up alone, working days and nights as a cleaner.
He went to Bupyeong High School, as did South Korean footballer Kim Nam-Il, and they remain very close friends. After winning a national Ssireum competition in 1998, he was invited by the stablemaster of the recently opened Kasugayama stable to come to Japan. He saw the opportunity to support his family back in Korea, and took a leave of absence from his university.

Career 
He made his professional debut in November 1998. For his first couple of tournaments he fought under the shikona of Kimu, but this was soon changed to Kasugaō, the name adapted from both his stable and his stablemaster's old fighting name of Kasugafuji.

Kasugaō reached the jūryō division in July 2002 and the top makuuchi division just three tournaments later in January 2003, after winning the second division championship in November 2002 by defeating Asasekiryū on the last day. On the same day Asashōryū won the makuuchi division title, making it the first time that two foreign born wrestlers had won the top two divisions in the same tournament. Kasugaō sent all his prize money of two million yen home to his mother.

In his top division debut Kasugaō scored an impressive ten wins and was awarded the Fighting Spirit Prize. He progressed to maegashira 6 but then a series of poor results sent him back down to the jūryō division. In 2004 the Japan Sumo Association organized a tour of Seoul, and even though he had fallen to jūryō Kasugaō was still highly sought after by the Korean sumo fans.

After moving between the top two divisions a couple of times he won promotion back to makuuchi in September 2005 and reached his highest rank of maegashira 3 in March 2007. He was forced to withdraw from the May 2008 tournament with only three wins, after suffering a knee injury on the 8th day, which resulted in demotion back to the jūryō division. He also missed out on an exhibition tour of Los Angeles in June. He scored nine wins in the July 2008 tournament, returning him to the top division for September, but he could only turn in a disastrous 2-13 there, and was demoted to jūryō once again. After four tournaments away, he returned to makuuchi for the July 2009 tournament and came through with a winning record. He applied for Japanese citizenship in June 2009 and became a citizen three months later in September. A poor 3-12 score in November 2009 saw him demoted to jūryō again for the January 2010 tournament, but a 9-6 score was enough for an immediate re-promotion to the top division. On this occasion he lasted only one tournament before being demoted again, but he won promotion to makuuchi for the eighth time in September 2010 after another 9-6 in July. In January 2011 he took his second jūryō division championship, more than eight years after his first, with a 12-3 record and a play-off win over Tochinowaka.

Retirement from sumo 
After an investigation by the Sumo Association into allegations of bout-rigging prompted by the discovery of text-messages on a mobile phone belonging to former maegashira Kasuganishiki, Kasugaō was one of 23 wrestlers and coaches found guilty of involvement. He was ordered to retire, and submitted his letter of resignation on April 4, 2011. His danpatsu-shiki, or official retirement ceremony was held on May 28, 2011, with guests such as Hiroki Matsukata, Yoo Ji-tae and Choi Hong-man attending.

Fighting style
Like many wrestlers, Kasugaō was fond of yotsu-sumo or grappling techniques, his most common winning move being yori-kiri or force out. His favourite grip on the mawashi was migi-yotsu, with his left hand outside and right hand inside his opponent's arms. However, he was also adept at throws, his next two most often used techniques being kote-nage, the armlock throw, and uwate-nage, the outer-arm throw.

Career record

See also 
List of sumo tournament second division champions
Glossary of sumo terms
List of non-Japanese sumo wrestlers
List of past sumo wrestlers

References

External links 

1977 births
Living people
Japanese people of Korean descent
Japanese sumo wrestlers
Naturalized citizens of Japan
Sportspeople from Incheon
South Korean emigrants to Japan
South Korean sumo wrestlers
Sportspeople banned for life